Playlist: The Very Best of Toni Braxton is the fourth greatest hits compilation album by R&B singer Toni Braxton. It is a part of Sony BMG's Playlist series. It was released in the United States on October 28, 2008.

Background and content 
"Playlist: The Very Best of Toni Braxton" is the fourth compilation released by Braxton, following "The Essential Toni Braxton, in 2007. The album was released on October 28, 2008, by Legacy Recordings, being part of Sony BMG's Playlist series. The track list contains Braxton most successful singles, with a few different tracks, such as "A Better Man" from her fourth studio album, "More Than a Woman" (2002), "Maybe", a single from "The Heat" and a Hex Hector remix for "Spanish Guitar".

In 2013, a new version of the compilation was released, with a different cover art and track list. The new edition contains the singles "Another Sad Love Song", "I Don't Want To" and "Just Be a Man About It", who were scrapped from the first edition, as well as Braxton's latest singles, "Yesterday" and "Hands Tied".

Track listing

References 

Toni Braxton compilation albums
Braxton, Toni
2008 compilation albums